Microcerotermes greeni, is a species of small termite of the genus Microcerotermes. It is found from Ambalangoda area of Sri Lanka. It is a secondary pest of tea.

References

External links
Evolution and Systematic Significance of Wing Micro-sculpturing

Termites
Insects described in 1913